Piyassili (also transliterated as Piyaššili; died ca. 1315 BC), also known as Sarri-Kusuh (or Šarri-Kušuḫ), was a Hittite prince and a middle son of King Šuppiluliuma I—younger than the heir Arnuwanda II, but older than the eventual successor Muršili II and probably older than the ill-fated Zannanza too. After Šuppiluliuma concluded a treaty with Shattiwaza, son of King Tushratta of Mitanni, and married one of his daughters to him, Piyassili led a Hittite army that put Shattiwaza on the throne of Hanigalbat. According to Hittite sources, Piyassili and Shattiwaza crossed the Euphrates at Carchemish, then marched against Irridu, already in Hurrian territory. After having reduced Irridu and Harran, they continued east towards to Washukanni and perhaps conquered the capital Taite as well.

Biography
After Shattiwaza had been made a vassal ruler of Hanigalbat, Suppiluliuma gave to Piyassili the Hurrian name Sarri-Kusuh and the territory of Ashtata (with the cities of Ekalte, Ahuna and Terqa) and Carchemish, formerly belonging to Hanigalbat. "And all of the cities of the land of Carchemish, Murmurik, Shipri, Mazuwati and Šurun – these fortified cities– I gave to my son." In fact, the whole former territory of Hanigalbat west of the Euphrates seems to have come under direct Hittite rule and was governed by Piyassili.

When the Egyptians attacked Kadesh, Šuppiluliuma besieged and retook the town. The people were deported and Šuppiluliuma made Piyassili governor of that town as well. Still bearing the name "Sarri-Kusuh" Piyashshili came to Muršili's aid in the campaign against Arzawa around 1320 BC. Piyassili then returned to Carchemish.

Piyassili fell ill and died before the ninth year of Muršili II's reign. After his death, a rebellion broke out in Kadesh and Nuhašše. After it had been quelled, Piyassili's son was made king of Carchemish by his uncle Muršili II.

References

External links
Text of the Suppiluliuma-Shattiwazza treaty

Hittite people
Hittite viceroys of Carchemish
1310s BC deaths
Year of birth unknown
14th-century BC rulers
15th-century BC rulers